The 1978 Connecticut gubernatorial election was held on November 7, 1978. Incumbent Democrat Ella Grasso and running mate Bill O'Neill defeated Republican nominee Ronald A. Sarasin and running mate Lewis Rome with 59.15% of the vote.

Primary elections
Primary elections were held on September 12, 1978.

Democratic primary

Candidates
Ella Grasso, incumbent Governor
Robert K. Killian, incumbent Lieutenant Governor

Results

General election

Candidates
Ella Grasso, Democratic
Ronald A. Sarasin, Republican

Results

References

1978
Connecticut
Gubernatorial